Eel City is the name given to a community of deep-sea eels living amongst hydrothermal vents in the new volcano of Nafanua in American Samoa. It is unique because most hydrothermal vents are predominantly inhabited by invertebrates, whereas there is little invertebrate life in Eel City.

The community of eels was discovered in 2005, when a new volcanic cone, Nafanua, was discovered inside the submerged caldera of Vailulu'u volcanic sea mount. The eels were identified as synapobranchid eels Dysommina rugosa, which are known from trawl samples in both the Atlantic and Pacific oceans, but have never before been studied in their natural habitat. They are deep sea fishes, bottom dwellers, up to 37 cm long.

Preliminary work indicates that they use the vent only as a place to live. They seem to feed not on chemosynthetic bacteria, but on crustaceans that pass by Nafanua's summit in the currents.

During the initial dive in March 2005, one of the discoverers, Hubert Staudigel (a geologist at San Diego's Scripps Institution of Oceanography), commented "I suppose it's possible they migrate up the water column and feed in the water column and migrate back down to the cracks and crevices to hang out. But it seems odd that a deep-sea fish that would normally be experiencing 2- to 5-degree Celsius (35.6 degrees to 41 degrees Fahrenheit) water would be seeking out water that is warmer."

References

Organisms living on hydrothermal vents
Hot springs of American Samoa